Events in the year 1919 in British-administered Palestine (British-controlled part of OETA territory).

Events

 3 January – The signing of the Faisal Weizmann Agreement by Emir Feisal (son of the King of Hejaz) and Chaim Weizmann (later President of the World Zionist Organization) as part of the Paris Peace Conference, 1919.
 22 January to 10 February – First meeting of the Palestine Arab Congress held in Jerusalem.
 26 February – The first official meeting of the Zionist General Council.
 8 August – The newspaper Doar HaYom is founded.

Notable births

 19 April – Haneh Hadad, Israeli Arab police officer and member of Knesset.
 8 May – Aharon Remez, Israeli civil servant, politician and diplomat, and second commander of the Israeli Air Force (died 1994).
 10 June – Haidar Abdel-Shafi, Palestinian Arab physician, and later politician (died 2007).
 1 July – Nissim Eliad, Israeli politician (died 2014).
 2 August – Nehemiah Persoff, Jerusalem-born American Jewish film and television actor, and later painter.
 5 August – Menachem Ratzon, Israeli politician (died 1987).
 Full date unknown
 Binyamin Gibli, head of Israeli military intelligence (died 2008).
 Ya'akov Mizrahi, Israeli politician (died 1979).
 Hanna Ben Dov, Israeli painter (died 2008).
 Jabra Ibrahim Jabra, Palestinian Arab poet. (died 1994).

Notable deaths
 30 July – Yosef Bussel (born 1891), Belarus-born Zionist activist, one of the founders of kibbutz Degania Alef.
 21 October – Ester Yael Kook (born 1907), youngest daughter of Rabbi Abraham Isaac Kook.

References

 
Mandatory Palestine
Years in Mandatory Palestine